Mellenville is a hamlet in Columbia County, New York, United States. Mellenville has a post office with ZIP code 12544.

References

Hamlets in Columbia County, New York
Hamlets in New York (state)